Rabbi Yaakov Luban is the rabbi of Congregation Ohr Torah in Edison, New Jersey, United States. He is also the Executive Rabbinic Coordinator at the Orthodox Union Kosher and is a member of the Va'ad HaRabbonim of Raritan Valley. He learned under Rabbi Chaim Shmuelevitz in the Mir yeshiva in Jerusalem, Israel. He also learned in Talmudical Yeshiva of Philadelphia and in Beth Medrash Govoha. He received his rabbinic ordination in 1979 from Rabbi Shneur Kotler.

His brother, Rabbi Binyomin Luban is the rosh yeshiva in Yeshiva Chafetz Chaim of Florida.

Articles by Rabbi Luban
Mezonos Rolls
Is Your Oven Kosher? What Every Kosher Cook Must Know
Fraudulent Claims! How to be Your Own Detective
Separating Terumah and Ma'aser

References

External links
Ohr Torah

American Haredi rabbis
Beth Medrash Govoha alumni
People from Edison, New Jersey
Year of birth missing (living people)
Living people
Rabbis from New Jersey
Mir Yeshiva alumni
21st-century American Jews